Carex sutchuensis is a tussock-forming species of perennial sedge in the family Cyperaceae. It is native to south central parts of China.

See also
List of Carex species

References

sutchuensis
Taxa named by Adrien René Franchet
Plants described in 1895
Flora of China